John Whitty (1780–1864) was an Irish Anglican priest: Archdeacon of Kilfenora from 1822  until his death in 1864.

He was educated at Trinity College, Dublin and served for many years as Rector of Kilmanaheen.

He died on 13 February 1864.

Notes

Alumni of Trinity College Dublin
Archdeacons of Kilfenora
19th-century Irish Anglican priests
People from County Clare
1780 births
1864 deaths